Events in the year 2023 in Algeria.

Incumbents 

 President: Abdelmadjid Tebboune
 Prime Minister: Aymen Benabderrahmane

Events 
Ongoing – COVID-19 pandemic in Algeria

 23 January – During a military exercise, an Algerian Air Force Mi-171 helicopter crashes in Algeria, killing 3 crew on board.

Scheduled

 25 November 2022 – May 2023: 2022–23 Algerian Cup
 13 January – 4 February: 2022 African Nations Championship

See also 

 COVID-19 pandemic in Africa
 2020s
 African Union
 Arab League
 al-Qaeda in the Islamic Maghreb
 Islamic State of Iraq and the Levant – Algeria Province

References 

 
Algeria
Algeria
2020s in Algeria
Years of the 21st century in Algeria